Li Haoran (born 5 November 1999) is a Chinese footballer who played as a winger for Tianjin Jinmen Tiger.

Career statistics

Club

References

1999 births
Living people
Footballers from Changchun
Chinese footballers
Chinese expatriate footballers
Association football wingers
Slovenian PrvaLiga players
Chinese Super League players
Shanghai Port F.C. players
R.S.C. Anderlecht players
NK Rudar Velenje players
Royal Antwerp F.C. players
Tianjin Jinmen Tiger F.C. players
Chinese expatriate sportspeople in Belgium
Expatriate footballers in Belgium
Expatriate footballers in Slovenia